Yahia Attiyat Allah El Idrissi (born 2 March 1995) is a Moroccan professional footballer who plays as a left-back or left winger for Botola club Wydad AC and the Morocco national team.

International career 
On 10 November 2022, he was named in Morocco's 26-man squad for the 2022 FIFA World Cup in Qatar.

Honours
Wydad AC
Moroccan League : 2020–21, 2021–22
CAF Champions League :  2021-22

Individual
Wydad AC Player of the Year: 2021–22

References

External links
 
 

1995 births
Living people
People from Safi, Morocco
Moroccan footballers
Association football fullbacks
Association football wingers
Olympic Club de Safi players
Volos N.F.C. players
Wydad AC players
Super League Greece players
Botola players
2022 FIFA World Cup players
Morocco international footballers
Moroccan expatriate footballers
Moroccan expatriate sportspeople in Greece
Expatriate footballers in Greece